Theodore Fairhurst (born April 18, 1947) is a Canadian fine artist, entrepreneur, high-altitude mountain climber and public speaker. On December 9, 2018, at the age of 71 years and 231 days, Fairhurst became the oldest person in the world, 1st North American, and 9th person in history to have scaled all the Seven Summits and all the Volcanic Seven Summits.

Early years

Born in Westmount, Quebec of Canadian and English descent, Fairhurst grew up in Montreal. He went to Elizabeth Ballantyne Elementary School, Montreal West High School and Concordia University. He began drawing and painting at age four and studied at the Montreal Museum of Fine Arts in his youth. At 22 years old, his desire to see and experience the world began and he traveled to Europe and Asia.  In the Netherlands (1972), Fairhurst transported young travelers around Europe and North Africa for several years.

Fairhurst continued producing art and exhibited at the Atrium Mensa in Amsterdam in 1974. He returned to Montreal in 1976 to advance his artistic career: "His interpretations of “man’s relationship to science and technology” painted on Plexiglas was a body of work that he is still very proud of. He had exhibitions here, in the U.S. and in Europe".

Business 

In 1983, Fairhurst built a real estate development business in Montreal. He was recognized by the City de Montreal for several of his projects in 1992. He continues to manage these companies.

Mountaineering

Fairhurst became interested in mountains while living in Banff, Alberta in 1969. Later the same year, he went to Nepal and hiked alone for 32 days from Kathmandu to the Khumbu Glacier at the foot of Mount Everest. This experience motivated him to return and climb Mount Everest.

Between 2006 and 2014, Fairhurst completed the Seven Summits achievement by climbing Aconcagua, Denali, the Vinson Massif, Mount Everest, Mount Kilimanjaro, Mount Elbrus, Puncak Jaya, and Mount Kosciuszko. He has also climbed Cho Oyu and Mont Blanc.

At the age of 70, within an approximate 8-month period from 2017-2018, Fairhurst successfully climbed 6 of the Volcanic Seven Summits. Unfortunately, when he was 75m from the top of his final climb, Ojos del Salado, he was shut down. Fairhurst ultimately completed the final climb on December 9, 2018 making him the ninth and first North American to complete both the Seven Summits and Volcanic Seven Summits. He currently holds the record for being the oldest person in the world to accomplish this feat.

Mountaineering Timeline

Seven Summits

Volcanic Seven Summits

Other Climbs

Video
Fairhurst's video Mount Everest ICE FALL has gone viral on YouTube with over 3.5 million views to date. He shot it with a helmet-mounted camera (POV) in the perspective of the climber. It has video images of the Khumbu Glacier as it breaks up descending from the Western Cwm to Base Camp. Voted top 10 at Killarney 2011 Adventure Film Festival.

Media
Author Jean-Pierre Lemaitre discussed Fairhurst in his book, 'Pas d’excuses’, stating: "I have been impressed by the way Ted Fairhurst managed his life. His philosophy of life is in harmony with the messages and techniques that I present in my book. That's why I decided to make him a key figure in my book. Page after page we discover how he managed to live his passions and to have the life he always wanted. Ted is an example for our youth!"

In 2010, Fairhurst served as the Honorary Chairman of the English Montreal School Board in its annual International Walk to School Day.

Other
Fairhurst serves as a director of the ESPRIT DE CORPS FOUNDATION.

On August 2, 2014, Fairhurst sailed a Volvo Ocean 60 across the North Atlantic to Quebec.

References

External links

Dare to Reach website
Official Youtube Channel

1947 births
Living people
Sir George Williams University alumni
People from Westmount, Quebec